Home and Away is an Australian soap opera first broadcast on the Seven Network on 17 January 1988. The following is a list of characters that first appeared in 1993, by order of first appearance. They were all introduced by the show's then executive producer Andrew Howie, who had succeeded Des Monaghan. The 6th season of Home and Away began airing on 11 January 1993. In January, John Adam and Laura Vazquez began appearing as Luke Cunningham and Sarah Thompson, respectively. Melissa George arrived in March playing Angel Brooks, while Imogen Miller was introduced in April. David Dixon began playing Nathan Roberts in October. Simon Baker took on the role of James Hudson in November.

Luke Cunningham
	 
Luke Cunningham, played by John Adam debuted on-screen during the episode broadcast on 12 January 1993 and departed on 27 July 1994. Adam previously guest starred in the serial in 1990 as soldier Dave Porter. In 1994, Adam was axed along with the characters of Sarah Thompson (Laura Vasquez), Tug O'Neale (Tristan Bancks) and Roxanne Miller (Lisa Lackey). The Serial's Producers did not inform them about their departures and they read about it in an issue of TV Week.

Luke arrives in Summer Bay after taking a teaching post at the high school. His busking annoys Alf Stewart (Ray Meagher) and Michael Ross (Dennis Coard) who resolve to drive him out of town but Luke's new colleague Roxanne Miller
informs them who he is and Michael agrees to rent a caravan to him. Luke offers saxophone lessons to  Sam Marshall (Ryan Clark) and helps Damian Roberts (Matt Doran) with his training. He is also instrumental in getting Sarah Thompson and Angel Brooks (Melissa George) enrolled at school. Luke and Roxy become friends and begin dating. Roxy's sister, Imogen (Sofie Formica) makes a play for Luke but he turns her down and she conspires to split them up by playing mind games with them. Ailsa Stewart (Judy Nunn) discovers Imogen's true intentions and Imogen leaves. Luke's mentally disabled brother, Bill (Craig Beamer) comes to visit. Luke feels responsible for his condition as he was meant to be watching Bill when he nearly drowned. He becomes over protective of Bill and disapproves of his friendship with Finlay Roberts (Tina Thomsen) as Bill is clearly attracted to her and he feels that he would not be able to cope with his feelings. Bill runs away after being caught by Michael in Fin's room while she is asleep. Bill is found after a gruelling search and Luke decides to send him to stay with their aunt. This proves to be the end for Luke and Roxy's relationship as he has been focused on Bill. Luke and Roxy remain working together closely  and take charge of the school musical. The musical is a disaster when Shane Parrish (Dieter Brummer) and Tug O'Neale come to blows, forcing the show to be cancelled.

Luke and Bobby Marshall (Nicolle Dickson) accept a boat ride from Adam Cameron (Mat Stevenson) at the Bay's carnival. Luke warns Adam to slow down but it is too late and he hits a log causing the three of them to be thrown from the boat. Luke suffers cracked ribs while Bobby sustains a head injury which leaves her comatose and she is later declared brain dead. Luke urges Adam to make a confession. Bobby's widower Greg (Ross Newton) then leaves Summer Bay and rents the Beach  House to Luke and Roxy, who inherit Tug as a fellow boarder. Luke's feelings for Roxy resurface but she rebuffs him after he kisses her. His mood is not helped when new janitor Nathan Roberts (David Dixon) begins antagonising him. Luke grabs Nathan after he goads him and  Nathan alleges Luke hit him. After failing to convince anyone of his innocence, Luke quits. He is exonerated when Nathan is arrested for stealing from the school but Donald Fisher (Norman Coburn) tells him he will have to reapply. James Hudson (Simon Baker) ends up taking Luke's job and dating Roxy much to his ire. However, within several weeks James leaves the Bay and Luke is rehired.

Irene Roberts (Lynne McGranger) buys the house and lets Luke and Tug stay as her tenants. After Irene sleepwalks into Luke's bedroom, He worries she is attracted to him and he talks to her about it, only Irene begins to think he is after her. Luke and Irene have a further misunderstanding when Luke plays a joke on Irene by inviting Donald to dinner and convincing her she likes him. However, the plan backfires. Luke notices Tug is dyslexic and persuades him to go back to school. He then suggests Tug take classes with tutor Beth Armstrong (Toni Pearen).

Donald's daughter Rebecca (Danielle Carter)  takes a job at the school and Luke seems  interested in her but the fact Donald disapproves of her having a relationship causes him to steer clear. When they do eventually get together, Luke decides he is not  that keen and ends things. Although Rebecca ultimately forgives him, Donald is furious that she has been humiliated and begins making life difficult for Luke. Upon learning his mother has fallen ill, Luke resigns to go and take care of Bill in the city but clears the air with  Donald before leaving.

"Channel 5 chose the episode featuring Luke's debut as one of their favourite ever Home and Away episodes". In 2018, Alan Loughnane from Joe critiqued Luke's characterisation stating that "Luke Cunningham was getting far too cheeky with Alf back in the day. Although, if we had that glorious hair, we'd probably be insufferably cocky as well."

Sarah Thompson

Sarah Thompson, portrayed by Laura Vasquez made her first appearance on 26 January 1993 and departed in October 1994. Vasquez returned in 1995 and 2005 to guest star. She described her "biggest breakthrough" career wise as her final screen test for the role of Sarah.
In 1994, Vasquez left Home and Away to pursue a career in music. But a writer from TV Week claimed that Vasquez discovered that Sarah was being written out after they published the story in their magazine.  Lisa Anthony of  BIG! Magazine said that "quiet" Sarah and "tough" Tug were not an obvious match. The episodes featuring the climax of Tug and Shane's feud where Sarah is caught in the middle at the school musical were nominated for "Best Television Episode in a Serial Drama".

Angel Parrish

Angel Parrish portrayed by Melissa George made her first on-screen appearance on 30 March 1993 and departed on 30 August 1996. George and a friend, Cara Mitchinson both acted in a mock episode of Home and Away with a video camera playing Bobby and Sophie Simpson respectively. When the offer of a role on the serial came, George's parents convinced her to relocate from her native Perth to Sydney and she began lodging with families. George met with casting director Liz Mullinar and was subsequently cast in the role. George's portrayal of Angel earned her  "Most Popular New Talent" and "Most Popular Actress" Logie Awards.

Imogen Miller

Imogen Miller, played by Sofie Formica, made her first screen appearance on 15 April 1993. Home and Away marked Formica's first acting job in a major television series. She was offered the role shortly after she interviewed Lisa Lackey for another show. Formica was contracted for six weeks.

Imogen is Roxanne Miller's  (Lackey) younger, adopted sister. She arrived in Summer Bay with "a chip on her shoulder the size of Ayers Rock" due to living in the shadow of her more successful sister. Formica commented that anything Roxy had, Imogen wanted including her boyfriend Luke Cunningham (John Adam). Formica explained, "Part of it is that she really fancies him, but I think the real reason is that he's her sister's boyfriend. Imogen is a little bit bitter and twisted and there's a great rivalry between the two sisters." Formica enjoyed playing Imogen, as she was so dissimilar to herself. She also called Imogen "a total bitch".

Imogen tries to seduce Roxy's boyfriend Luke Cunningham, but he rebuffs her. Roxy tries to set Imogen up with Nick Parrish (Bruce Roberts), who is interested in her but Imogen is firmly set on Luke and tries to get him alone at every opportunity. She begins stealing Roxy's exam papers and sabotaging her cakes in order to make her look bad. It is discovered that Imogen has resented Roxy for years due to jealousy. Ailsa Stewart (Judy Nunn) quickly sees through Imogen's innocent act. Roxy reaches out to her but Imogen rejects her help and leaves town telling her she will never see her again.

Nathan Roberts

Nathan Roberts, played by David Dixon, made his first appearance on screen during the episode airing 18 October 1993. and departed on 4 February 1994.  When the character returned in 2002, Craig Ball was cast in the role.

Nathan arrives in Summer Bay and causes trouble with the local residents. Dixon told Richard Galpin from BIG! magazine that Nathan gets into everything and does everything; adding "shit, come to think of it, I think I [Nathan] get into a fight with everybody". He explained that his character steals cameras, money and even attempts to "steal" Sarah Thompson's (Laura Vasquez) virginity. Nathan lures Sarah into the back of his car and seduces her in scenes which served as Dixon's first on-screen kiss. He revealed that he did not enjoy filming the tryst because he was too busy concentrating on speaking the following lines. Nathan's scenario with Sarah causes angst between him and her ex-boyfriend Tug O'Neale (Tristan Bancks). During one fight scene with Bancks in which Tug was supposed to "shove" Nathan after he brands him a "jerk", Dixon complained that Bancks actually caused him pain. Of Nathan's enemies he gains Dixon stated: "Tug goes from hating me to loving me to hating me. Damian Roberts (Matt Doran) hates, loves, and then hates me. Alf Stewart (Ray Meagher) haaaates me! Luke Cunningham (John Adam) really hates me, and Adam Cameron (Mat Stevenson) loves me." Dixon remained in the role for a period of three months and when he finished filming he spoke of resuming his career in music.

In 2012, Lynne McGranger who plays Irene Roberts, told a writer from What's on TV that she would "love" her on-screen son Nathan return to the serial. She added that the "last time we saw him he was off touring with an Irish nurse. So I think he's gone back to Ireland and is going to get married there. So I think Irene should go over to Ireland to see him."

In April 1994, BIG!'s Galpin said that Nathan caused havoc in Summer Bay by "getting up just about everybody's noses".

Nathan arrives in Summer Bay on parole from Juvenile detention and moves in with Irene and Adam. He claims to be a reformed character but steals a caravan park customer's camera. Adam quickly sees through Nathan's act and threatens to expose him. Nathan catches the eye of Sarah and they begin dating much to anger of Sarah's ex-boyfriend, Tug. Sarah's foster parents disapprove of Nathan and they forbid her to see him. Nathan's influence over his younger brother, Damian is a concern. Nathan then decides he wants to take things further with Sarah and the pair sneak off at an end of Year party and prepare to have sex in Nathan's car. Alf catches them and punches Nathan, resulting in him being arrested. Nathan decides to drop the charges. While working as the Janitor at the school, Nathan is tempted by $900 in school fees and steals the money from Donald Fisher's (Norman Coburn) office. Damian suspects him immediately but Sarah refuses to believe it. He is eventually found to be the culprit and is jailed. The following year it is revealed Nathan paid his cellmate Brian "Dodge" Forbes (Kelly Dingwall) to kill his estranged father, Murdoch (Tom Richards).

Nathan is paroled in 2002 and returns to Summer Bay to live with Irene after his sister, Finlay (Tina Thomsen) throws him out. He encounters Alf who is still harbouring a grudge and clashes with Nick Smith (Chris Egan) at every turn. Irene finds him a job as a waiter at the Beachside Diner but after Colleen Smart (Lyn Collingwood) informs locals about Nathan's time in prison and customers boycott the restaurant. Leah Patterson (Ada Nicodemou) has no choice but to sack Nathan after takings are low. Nathan then begins drinking heavily. He steals Alf's Ute and but notices a bus carrying a group of Year 10s, which Nick is among, has crashed and helps rescue them before the vehicle explodes. Nathan is hailed a hero and interviewed by a local news station. He then takes an interest in Nick's nurse Grace O'Connor (Mary Docker). Alf offers Nathan a job on his boat as a deckhand and he accepts. For a 30th birthday present, Irene arranges for Nathan to take a joyflight and he enjoys it. When he learns Grace is about to leave for Alice Springs, Nathan decides to leave with her and bids Irene an emotional farewell.

James Hudson

James Hudson, played by Simon Baker, made his first appearance on screen during the episode airing 19 November 1993 and departed on 16 February 1994. James works as a photography teacher at the school. In December 1993, Alex Cramb from Inside Soap reported that executive producer Andrew Howie was impressed with Healy's work in the guest role and wanted to sign him up for a long-term basis. The writer added that James would become romantically involved with Roxanne Miller (Lisa Lackey) following her break-up with Luke Cunningham (John Adam). In his book Super Aussie Soaps, Andrew Mercado notes that Roxy and Luke's relationship was "left on shaky ground thanks to her growing friendship with James". The situation between James and Roxy soon becomes intimate and Lackey told a reporter from Soap that "even I was shocked how quickly that happened". James and Roxy begin dating but their relationship is short-lived and does not remain in Summer Bay after Roxy breaks up with him. Soap later featured a story confirming that James had been written out of the series. Their columnist reported that Baker had argued with producers over storylines and the actor added "you're not paid to have views - you're paid to button your lip and churn it out."

The columnist from Soap said that James was "nasty", "dastardly" and bemoaned him as the "boo-hiss supply teacher who arrived to take Luke Cunningham's job and ended up taking his woman too." They added that it was "steamy stuff for the normally coy Home and Away". In 2012, Channel 5 chose the episode in which James tries to woo Roxy as one of their best ever episodes from the past twenty-five years.

James arrives in Summer Bay to fill a teaching position vacated by Luke. Luke is annoyed as he had reapplied for the position and matters are not helped when Luke's housemate and ex-girlfriend Roxy invites James to move in with them at the beach house. There is an attraction between James and Roxy and James enlists Luke's help to win Roxy's heart. Luke suggests feigning an interest in the same things that interest Roxy, but Roxy sees through the ruse. James soon leaves town soon after being offered a better job. Roxy and James try to keep things going long distance but they agree to break up.

Others

References

External links
Characters and cast at the Official AU Home and Away website
Characters and cast at the Official UK Home and Away website
Characters and cast at the Internet Movie Database

, 1993
, Home and Away